The Louisville Belles are a team of the Women's Spring Football League based in Louisville, Kentucky.  Home games are played at the campuses of Seneca High School and Ballard High School.

During their first two seasons, the Belles were known as the Louisville Nightmare and played in the Independent Women's Football League.

Season-by-season

|-
| colspan="6" align="center" | Louisville Nightmare (IWFL)
|-
|2009 || 0 || 8 || 0 || 26th Tier II || --
|-
|2010 || 0 || 7 || 0 || 6th Tier II West Midwest || --
|-
| colspan="6" align="center" | Louisville Belles (WSFL)
|-
|2011 || -- || -- || -- || -- || -- 
|-
!Totals || 0 || 15 || 0
|colspan="2"|

Season schedules

2009

** = Forfeited

2010

** = Forfeited

External links
Women's Spring Football League official website

Women's Spring Football League teams
Sports teams in Louisville, Kentucky
American football teams in Kentucky
American football teams established in 2009
Women's sports in Kentucky
2009 establishments in Kentucky